Howard Mason Gore (October 12, 1877June 20, 1947) was an American politician.  He served as the 8th Secretary of Agriculture from 1924 to 1925, during the administration of President Calvin Coolidge, and he served as 17th governor of West Virginia from 1925 to 1929.

Biography
Gore was born in Harrison County, West Virginia, to farmer Solomon Deminion Gore and his wife Marietta Payne (née Rogers).  Gore attended West Virginia University in 1900.  He married the former Roxalene (Roxie) Corder Bailey on September 30, 1906.  She died on March 7, 1907, and he remained a widower in office.

Gore served as president of the West Virginia Livestock Association from 1912 until 1916. He was appointed to the West Virginia State Board of Education from 1920 until 1925. On November 22, 1924, Gore served briefly as the Secretary of Agriculture following the death of his predecessor, Henry C. Wallace (1866–1924).

On November 4, 1924, Gore was elected Governor of West Virginia in the 1924 election. He assumed the governorship at the end of the partial first term of President Calvin Coolidge on March 4, 1925. Gore then served as the West Virginia Commissioner of Agriculture from 1931 until 1933.

He died in Clarksburg, West Virginia, on June 20, 1947. He is interred there in the Elkview Masonic Cemetery.

References

External links
 Biography of Howard M. Gore
 Inaugural Address of Howard M. Gore
West Virginia & Regional History Center at West Virginia University, Howard M. Gore papers

|-

|-

1877 births
1947 deaths
Republican Party governors of West Virginia
People from Harrison County, West Virginia
United States Secretaries of Agriculture
Baptists from West Virginia
Coolidge administration cabinet members
20th-century American politicians
West Virginia University alumni